Norway competed at the 2014 Winter Paralympics in Sochi, Russia, held between 7–16 March 2014.

Alpine skiing

Men

Biathlon 

Men

Cross-country skiing

Men

Women

Relay

Ice sledge hockey

Roster
Ole Bjarte Austevoll
Audun Bakke
Magnus Bogle
Kristian Buen
Eskil Hagen
Kjell Christian Hamar
Martin Hamre
Emil Kirstistuen
Jan Roger Klakegg
Knut Andre Nordstoga
Rolf Einar Pedersen
Tor Joakim Rivera
Loyd-Remi Pallander Solberg
Emil Sorheim
Stig Tore Svee
Morten Vaernes

Preliminaries

Semifinal

Bronze Medal Game

Wheelchair curling

Team

Standings

Results

Draw 1
Saturday, March 8, 9:30

Draw 2
Saturday, March 8, 15:30

Draw 3
Saturday, March 9, 9:30

Draw 5
Monday, March 10, 9:30

Draw 6
Monday, March 10, 15:30

Draw 8
Tuesday, March 11, 15:30

Draw 9
Wednesday, March 12, 9:30

Draw 10
Thursday, March 12, 15:30

Draw 11
Thursday, March 13, 9:30

See also
Norway at the Paralympics
Norway at the 2014 Winter Olympics

References

Nations at the 2014 Winter Paralympics
2014
Winter Paralympics